Julia Wood may refer to:

 Julia A. A. Wood (pen name, Minnie Mary Lee; 1825-1903), American writer
 Julia A. Wood (1840-1927), American writer
 Julia T. Wood, American academic

See also
 Julie Wood
 Juli Wood
 Julian Wood